Beaumont's Halt railway station served the city of St Albans, Hertfordshire, England from 1905 to 1963 on the Nickey Line.

History 
The station opened on 9 August 1905 by the Midland Railway. It was situated on the south side of a footpath that was between Hempstead Road and the B487. There was initially no shelter but a petition was raised in 1907 to provide one to all four stations in 1907. It was named after the nearby Beaumont Hall. The station closed to passengers on 16 June 1947 and closed to goods on 1 July 1963.

References

External links 

Disused railway stations in Hertfordshire
Former Midland Railway stations
Railway stations opened in 1905
Railway stations closed in 1947
1905 establishments in England
1963 disestablishments in England
Redbourn
Railway stations in Great Britain opened in the 20th century